Rosa Barba (born 1972, Agrigento, Italy) is a German-Italian visual artist and filmmaker. Barba is known for using the medium of film and its materiality to create cinematic film installations, sculptures and publications, which inquire into the ambiguous nature of reality, memory, landscape and their role in their mutual constitution and representation.  Barba currently lives and works in Berlin, Germany.

Early life and education
Rosa Barba was born in 1972 in the town of Agrigento, on the Italian island of Sicily. She began at a young age to work with film. She very soon began experimenting with moving images using super 8 film. From 1993 to 1995 she studied Theater and Film Studies in Erlangen, Germany. She continued her studies in film between 1995 and 2000 at the Academy of Media Arts Cologne in Cologne, Germany. Barba made her first 16mm film while at the academy, titled Panzano (2000), in which three characters struggle to assign parts among themselves. In 2018, Barba acquired her PhD at the Malmö Art Academy at Lund University, under the supervision of Sarat Maharaj, professor for Visual Arts and Knowledge Systems.

Barba has actively continued to study film through a number of fine arts institutions and residencies, including the two-year residency program at Rijksakademie van Beeldende Kunsten in Amsterdam (2003-2004), Production-in-Residence program, Baltic Arts Center Visby (2006), Villa Aurora, Pacific Palisades, Los Angeles, USA (2006), IASPIS Stockholm (2007-2008) and the Artists-in-Residence-Programm of Chinati Foundation, Marfa, Texas (2013).

Later residencies include a stay at the Curtis R. Priem Experimental Media and Performing Arts Center EMPAC at Rensselaer Polytechnic Institute, Troy (NY) in 2014-15 and a residency at Headlands Center for the Arts in San Francisco (CA) in the spring of 2017. At EMPAC, Barba was commissioned a new work production in collaboration with Rensselaer's Hirsch Observatory, which resulted in two site-specific installations spanning different media formats, The Color out of Space and White Museum.

The various professional and educational experiences have brought Barba to teaching and she currently holds a Professorship in Fine Arts at the University of the Arts, Bremen.

Work
She exhibits in galleries and museums internationally. In 2018, solo shows of her work will be presented, amongst others, at Tabakalera, International Centre for Contemporary Culture, San Sebastián, and at Kunsthalle Bremen. Other recent solo shows include the Museo Nacional Centro de Arte Reina Sofía, Palacio de Cristal, Madrid (2017); Pirelli HangarBicocca, Milan (2017); Malmö Konsthall (2017); CAPC musée d'art contemporain de Bordeaux (2016-2017); Schirn Kunsthalle Frankfurt (2016); MIT Visual Arts Center, Cambridge, MA; Albertinum in Dresden; Center of Contemporary Art, Vilnius (2014); MAXXI, Rome (2014); Turner Contemporary in Margate (2013); Bergen Kunsthall (2013); MUSAC in Castilla y Leon (2013); Kunsthaus Zürich (2012), Jeu de Paume, Paris, (2012); Contemporary Art Museum St. Louis; Fondazione Galleria Civica, Trento, and MART, Rovereto (2011); Kunstverein Braunschweig (2011) and Tate Modern, London (2010).

Barba has participated in the 52nd and 53rd and 56th Venice Biennale. At the 56th Biennale All the World's Futures, curated by Okwui Enwezor (2015), Barba exhibited Bending to Earth (2015). She participated in the  Liverpool Biennale in 2010, in the 2nd Thessaloniki Biennale of Contemporary Art as well as in various festivals and other biennials. In 2010 she curated the group show A Curated Conference at the Museo Nacional Centro de Arte Reina Sofia, Madrid with works from the collection. Afterwards, the exhibition was the inspiration for the films The Hidden Conference I-III, which were performatively filmed in various museum depots.

Amongst other references, her work relates to avant-garde film and Speculative fiction.

Barba's works belong to collections such as Louisiana Museum of Modern Art, Humlebæk,  Hamburger Bahnhof - Museum für Gegenwart, Berlin], Museo Centro de Arte Reina Sofía, Madrid, MACBA, Barcelona and Kunsthaus Zürich.

Speaking about her participation in Performa 2013, Rosa Barba explains how she feels about live performance versus film/cinema: "My Performa piece brought a film to a live performance by using cinema as a new kind of stage. I created a new 35mm film, which was performed as a live event on the cinema screen in Anthology Film Archives’ screening theatre, whilst being fragmented around the space on 16mm films and filmic sculptures, which repeated an individual formal aspect, such as a sentence or a sound. Whilst almost behaving like characters, or stand-ins for the viewer, these films also interact with one another as though they were a splintered ensemble, fading in and out, and accompanied by an electronic musical accompaniment created by Jan St Werner of Mouse on Mars, and a group of professional voiceover actors who were performing live dialogue from various points in space. Subconscious Society – Live is an attempt to archive the last century, suggesting a paradigm shift, which is represented in the form of a social community, inhabiting a transitional realm, as they make a final attempt at assigning and archiving objects from the past. Here the past exists only as a reference to itself and the details of the present are not fully decipherable yet." Also in this interview, she talks about her influences: "Literature has influenced personal and is exposed in my various work. I like to situate my work in a timeless, more precise space – space with a lot of layered time, so the exact time can’t be deciphered anymore, acted out by sound, images and text."

One of her works, ‘PARACHUTABLE’ was donated to the Rijksakademie and sold by auction at Sotheby's Amsterdam ‘Global Contemporary, Rijksakademie’ – a big fundraising sale of approximately 120 Contemporary works of art, for the benefit of the Rijksakademie Artists' Endowment Fund, which will support present and future generations of talented artists working at the Rijksakademie by covering their research and production cost.

Film
Barba's films develop from situations that form societies and landscapes. By using her film camera as a drawing instrument, she outlines and relates directly to the formal properties of an object. She investigates environments and weaves stories of place and people into fictitious narratives that open up new possibilities for interpretation.

For example, in the film Outwardly from Earth's Center that was produced on the Swedish island Gotland during the winter of 2006 as a Production-in-Residence project for the Baltic Art Center in Sweden, Barba collaborated with the local inhabitants, who also performed in the film, to create narratives and form characters as the filming progressed. Outwardly from Earth's Center is constructed around a fictitious society living on the truly existing island of Gotska Sandön, which drifts approximately one meter per year and. The depiction of the small society trying to hold up the disappearance of the island develops into a surrealistic atmosphere that slowly but surely replaces the experience of what one might consider a beautiful documentary with a more abstract and somewhat absurd picture of people's struggle and vulnerability.

Sculpture and installation
Barba's sculptures and installations are created from the physical and conceptual components of the film which become dissected, abstracted, compiled and arranged anew. The roles and relations of the various components are questioned and newly defined: the mechanical objects move, speak and become the main protagonists in the exhibition space.

For example, the piece Boundaries of Consumption (2012) features a 16 mm projector directed at film cans with silver globes balancing while the film runs through. The shadow of this spatial set-up is projected as moving images on the wall, changing in colour and appearance over time.

Publications
Since 2004 Barba has been publishing a series of printed editions parallel to her films as another form to express and dismantle the cinematic organism. She conjugates its repertoire while she disbands and defines the relationships and hierarchies between image and word and like between image and viewer anew. The series Printed Cinema which won the artist book award 2006 at the Ontario Association of Art Galleries is published for specific exhibition spaces and accompanies her films as secondary literature for a limited time. The printed editions present an extended and free form of the exhibited film which reveal the filming process including research material and unused filmic fragments. The edition exists beyond the duration of the film. The filmic projection is translated into printed material and confronted with its conditions, materiality and temporality. Through the comparison of both media, the emphasis on image, language and text and their relationships and overlapping themes are shifted into a new light.

Awards (selected)
PIAC - Prix International d’Art Contemporain (International Contemporary Art Prize), Fondation Prince Pierre de Monaco (2016)
Experimental Film Award (Bending to Earth), 24th Curtas Vila do Conde International Film Festival (2016)
No Violence Award, 54th Ann Arbor Film Festival (2016)
Experimental Film Award (From Source to Poem), 25th Curtas Vila do Conde International Film Festival (2017)
Italian Council, 3rd Edition, Ministry of Cultural Heritage and Activities and Tourism, Rome (2018)
The Calder Prize, Calder Foundation, New York (2020)

References

Further reading
 Barba, Rosa (2017). From Source to Poem. with contributions by Manuel Borja-Villel, Giuliana Bruno, Joan Jonas, Elisabeth Lebovici, Roberta Tenconi. Hatje Cantz/Pirelli HangarBicocca with Malmö Konsthall. 
 Alemani, Cecilia: Rosa Barba interview by Cecilia Alemani, klat no. 2 (Spring 2010): 18-35

 Barba, Rosa: Contribution to Film. Eds. Tacita Dean and Nicholas Cullinan, Tate Modern, 2011
Barry, Robert: Les Marques Aveugles. www.frieze.com (January 16, 2012)
 Bell, Kirsty: Suspended Animation. Frieze, (May 2011): 118-121
 Borthwick, Ben and Gronlund, Melissa: Rosa Barba: Changing Cinema. www.afterall.org (November 12, 2010)
 Casadio, Mariuccia: Light Shaped. VOGUE ITALIA no. 7 (September 2011)
 Cooke, Lynne: Suspended Stories: Rosa Barba's Strategic Narrativity in Rosa Barba, White is an Image. Eds. Chiara Parisi and Andrea Viliani, Ostfildern: Hatje Cantz Verlag, 2011, p. 165-213
 Grzonka, Patricia: Rosa Barba- Weisses Licht erhellt die Nacht. Kunst Bulletin (Presse de Suisse). (August 17, 2012)
 Lebovici, Élisabeth: La porte dérobée comme cheval de Troie: Rosa Barba au jeu de Paume. le-beau_vice.blogspot.fr (May 23, 2012)
 Lebovici, Élisabeth: Looking for Rosa Barba in Rosa Barba, White is an Image. Eds. Chiara Parisi and Andrea Viliani, Ostfildern: Hatje Cantz Verlag, 2011, p. 45-95
 Manacorda, Francesco and Malasauskas, Raimundas: Rosa Barba's Unfilmed Films in Rosa Barba, White is an Image. Eds. Chiara Parisi and Andrea Viliani, Ostfildern: Hatje Cantz Verlag, 2011, p. 97-110
 Marchand, Antoine: 02 n° 63. Rosa Barba. Revue d'art contemporain trimestrielle et gratuite. (Autumn 2012): 18-24
 Micucci, Marjorie: 'Rosa Barba. Les Tempos d'un paysage choral'. Revue trimestrielle Mouvement (mars-avril 2013.
 Petresin-Bachelez, Natasa: On Performing the Traces That People Leave Behind in History in Rosa Barba, White is an Image. Eds. Chiara Parisi and Andrea Viliani, Ostfildern: Hatje Cantz Verlag, 2011, p. 133-155
 White, Ian: Rosa Barba. Camera Austria, no 101 (2008): 21–26.
 White, Ian: An Idea in Three Dimensions in Rosa Barba, White is an Image. Eds. Chiara Parisi and Andrea Viliani, Ostfildern: Hatje Cantz Verlag, 2011, p. 7-39

External links

 Rosa Barba, "In a Perpetual Now", in the art journal "Brooklyn Rail" (New York) (September 2021 issue): https://brooklynrail.org/2021/09/criticspage/In-a-Perpetual-Now
Vertiginous Mapping (web-based project)
2015 BOMB Magazine interview of Rosa Barba by Joan Jonas
 Watch Rosa Barba in conversation with Francesca Pietropaolo (Brooklyn Rail, May 17, 2022): https://www.youtube.com/watch?app=desktop&v=jxxjnjAsEa4

1972 births
Living people
20th-century German women artists
21st-century German women artists
20th-century Italian women artists
21st-century Italian women artists
German installation artists
German video artists
Italian installation artists
Italian contemporary artists
People from Agrigento